Aminoddole Plaza (Persian:  تیمچه امین الدوله -Timche-Aminoddole) is one of the several plazas and perhaps the most majestic one in the grand Bazaar of Kashan, Iran. 

The place mainly had been designed for commerce of merchandise but it is also being used for some important religious ceremonies in recent times. The most important one is Muharram, during which Hai'ats enter the place, sing elegies about tragic events happened to Hussain, the third Imam of Shi'a, and his close relatives in Karbala on the day of Ashura. It used to be an important place along the Silk Road. Its chambers traditionally served as a place for trading rugs woven by Kashanis or rugs brought from other cities. There are also some old antique shops and teahouses in the Timche plaza.

References 

Buildings and structures in Kashan
Caravanserais in Iran
National works of Iran